Morz (also Romanized as Marz) is a village in Abshur Rural District, Forg District, Darab County, Fars Province, Iran. At the 2006 census, its population was 3,512, in 720 families.

References 

Populated places in Darab County